Diamond is a ghost town in eastern Juab County, Utah, United States.  The Diamond Cemetery is listed on the National Register of Historic Places.

Description
There are multiple abandoned mines in the surrounding area, and it is considered part of (but south of the active area of) the Tintic Mining District.

The community received its name from the quartz crystals found in the area that were originally thought to be diamonds.

History
Diamond was first settled 1870 following the discovery of the "diamonds" in the area. Soon after a post office was established and saloons, stores, and even a school was built. The population eventually grew to about 900, but after water was struck in the nearby mines the last residents moved away in 1890 and the town was abandoned. However, the post office apparently remained open until 1906. The community's last house was moved in 1923. All that remains are the mining tailings and a cemetery.

Diamond Cemetery
The Diamond Cemetery is a small  property that is the only remaining remnant of the former town of Diamond (one of the earliest mining camps in the Tintic Mining District. Very little of the original cemetery remains, but at least one gravesite is still maintained and visited by the family of Amber Rose and possibly a new addition to the cemetery in 2014. The cemetery was added to the National Register of Historic Places March 14, 1979.

See also

 List of ghost towns in Utah
 National Register of Historic Places listings in Juab County, Utah

References

External links

 A whimsical blog entry on the ghost town, with photos

Ghost towns in Utah
Ghost towns in Juab County, Utah
National Register of Historic Places in Juab County, Utah
Cemeteries on the National Register of Historic Places in Utah
Mining communities in Utah